William Irving (August 15, 1766 – November 9, 1821) was a United States representative from New York, and the eldest brother of author Washington Irving.

Early life
Irving was born in New York City on August 15, 1766.   William was the eldest surviving son of eleven children born to William Irving Sr. (1731–1807), originally of Quholm, Shapinsay, Orkney, Scotland, and Sarah (née Sanders) Irving (1738–1817).  Among his surviving siblings were four brothers and three sisters, including: author and a member of the New York State Assembly Peter Irving, Ebenezer Irving, John Treat Irving, diplomat and author Washington Irving, Ann Irving (wife of Maj. Gen. Richard Dodge), Catherine Irving, and Sarah Irving.

Career
After completing preparatory studies, Irving Joined his father in the mercantile business.  From 1787 to 1791, he was a fur trader with the Indians along the Mohawk River, residing at Johnstown and Caughnawaga.

In 1793, he returned to New York City and, along with his brothers Peter and John, joined the Calliopean Society, a literary club for young men. He married, and in 1814 was elected as a Democratic-Republican to the Thirteenth Congress to fill the vacancy caused by the resignation of Egbert Benson.  He was reelected to the Fourteenth and Fifteenth Congresses and served from January 22, 1814, to March 3, 1819.  Irving, a close friend of James Kirke Paulding, the U.S. Secretary of the Navy under Martin Van Buren, supported the War of 1812.

Irving contributed several essays and poems to Salmagundi, written primarily by Washington Irving and James Kirke Paulding.

Personal life
In 1793, Irving was married to Julia Paulding (1768–1823), the daughter of William Paulding Sr. (one of the first members of the Provincial Congress), and sister of his friend James Kirke Paulding and William Paulding Jr. (a U.S. Representative, Mayor of New York City, and Adjutant General of New York). Together, they were the parents of:

 Lewis Graham Irving (1795–1879), who married Maria Carleton Hale (1797–1869) in 1823.
 Oscar Irving (1800–1865), who married Catharine E. C. Dayton (1800–1842) in 1827. After her death, he married his first cousin Eliza Dodge (1801–1887) in 1844.
 Pierre Munro Irving (1802–1876), who married Margaret Ann Berdan (d. 1832) in 1829. After her death, he married his first cousin Helen Dodge (1802–1885), sister of Eliza Dodge, in 1836.
 Julia Irving (1803–1872), who married fellow U.S. Representative Moses Hicks Grinnell (1803–1877).
 Henry Ogden Irving (1807–1869), an 1833 Columbia graduate.

Irving died in New York City on November 9, 1821.

Descendants
Through his daughter Julia, he was the grandfather of Julia Grinnell Bowdoin (1838–1915), the mother of prominent banker Temple Bowdoin, and Fannie Leslie Grinnell (1842–1887), who married society man Thomas Forbes Cushing, son of John Perkins Cushing.

Notes

References
 Jones, Brian Jay. Washington Irving: An American Original. New York: Arcade Publishing, 2008.

External links

1766 births
1821 deaths
Politicians from New York City
Burials at Sleepy Hollow Cemetery
Democratic-Republican Party members of the United States House of Representatives from New York (state)
Washington Irving